Bazarnes is a commune in the Yonne department in Bourgogne-Franche-Comté in north-central France. It lies 165 km away from the capital city of France, Paris. It is also 17 km away from Auxerre.

See also
Communes of the Yonne department

References

Communes of Yonne